Alan Zelick Trachtenberg (March 22, 1932 – August 18, 2020) was an American historian and the Neil Gray Jr. Professor of English and professor emeritus of American Studies at Yale University.

Biography
Born in Philadelphia, Trachtenberg attended Temple University, and earned his Ph.D. in American Studies at the University of Minnesota, writing his dissertation on the Brooklyn Bridge in American literature.

Trachtenberg taught at Penn State for eight years, then spent a year at the Stanford Center for Advanced Study in the Behavioral Sciences, before joining the faculty at Yale in 1969.

He resided in Hamden, Connecticut with his wife Betty (née Glassman), pianist and college administrator, was Dean of Students at Yale University from 1987 to 2007.

Trachtenberg's landmark 1990 book, Reading American Photographs: Images as History, Mathew Brady to Walker Evans– A Study of American Photography from 1839 to 1938, won the Charles C. Eldredge Prize that year.

Selected works
 Lincoln's Smile and Other Enigmas, Hill and Wang, 2007, .
 Shades of Hiawatha: Staging Indians, Making Americans, 1880-1930, Hill and Wang, 2004, .
 Distinctly American: The Photography of Wright Morris (with Ralph Lieberman) exh. cat. Iris & B. Gerald Cantor Center for Visual Arts at Stanford University, Merrill, 2002. .
 Reading American Photographs: Images as History, Mathew Brady to Walker Evans, Hill and Wang, 1990, .
 The Incorporation of America: Culture and Society in the Gilded Age, Hill and Wang, 1982, .
 Hart Crane, A Collection of Critical Essays. Prentice-Hall, 1982. .
 Classic Essays in Photography (editor), Leetes Island Books, 1981, .
 Brooklyn Bridge: Fact and Symbol, University Of Chicago Press, 1965, .

References

External links
The Incorporation of America: Culture and Society in the Gilded Age, online version.
Photographic portrait by Walker Evans, 1974, in the Metropolitan Museum of Art.
Tribute in the online Yale News, August 18, 2020.

1932 births
2020 deaths
Writers from Philadelphia
University of Minnesota College of Liberal Arts alumni
Yale University faculty
20th-century American historians
American male non-fiction writers
American academics of English literature
Jewish American historians
Historians of photography
20th-century American male writers
21st-century American Jews